Rudy or Rodolfo Fernandez may refer to:

 Rudy Fernandez (actor) (1952–2008), Filipino actor
 Rudy Fernández (baseball) (1911–2000), Cuban baseball player and manager
 Rudy Fernández (basketball) (born 1985), Spanish basketball player
 Rudy Fernandez (labor leader) (1927–1979), Filipino trade unionist
 Rudy Fernandez (triathlete) (1947–2022), Filipino triathlete
 Rodolfo Fernández (footballer) (born 1979), Paraguayan footballer